Korjus is a surname originating in Estonia and Finland (in Estonian, it means "carrion"). It's bearers include:
 (1926–1998), Finnish writer and editor
Kevin Korjus (born 1993), Estonian racing driver
Miliza Korjus (1909–1980), American opera singer and actress of Estonian descent
 (born 1942), Finnish actor and musician
Tapio Korjus (born 1961), Finnish javelin thrower
 (born 1981), Finnish hurdler

Estonian-language surnames
Finnish-language surnames